Maddalena Cerasuolo, also known as Lenuccia (Naples, 2 February 1920 – Naples, 23 October 1999), was an Italian patriot and antifascist partisan.

She is remembered especially for having actively participated with a significant role in the revolt against the Nazi army that occurred in Naples from 27 to 30 September 1943, which is remembered as the Four days of Naples.

Biography 

The life of Maddalena, as well as that of many of her peers, was split in two parts by World War II. Nevertheless, the war allowed her to stand out in the ranks of the Resistenza and as a secret agent, working with the United Kingdom.

After the war, she continued to live in Naples, until her death in 1999, after having married with surname Morgese and having two children, Gaetana and Gennaro.

Early years 
Maddalena's parents belonged to the working class; she was the daughter of Annunziata Capuozzo and Carlo Cerasuolo, who lived in the Stella neighborhood in Naples together with her other five sisters Titina, Maria, Anna, Dora, Rosaria and two brothers Giovanni and Vincenzo.

The father, Carlo, who was working as cook, in the 1910s participated in the Italo-Turkish War and also later in the Resistenza when he was registered and imprisoned several times for acts of resistance against Fascism. During World War II, he was initially employed by the company Ansaldo to manage the canteen. Later he was unemployed, thereby he put up an itinerant stall where he prepared and sold fried pizzas.

The mother, Annunziata, was employed as help-cook at Ansaldo too, following her husband. Later she helped him in his new activity.

When the war was breaking out, Maddalena was about 20 years old, working as craftswoman at a small shoe factory.

Entering the Resistenza 

During the war, Maddalena stood out when she participated in the gunfights that happened in the Materdei neighborhood, to avoid the German troops plundering the shoe factory near to vico delle Trone, in exchange for the weapons delivery. She volunteered to go alone on the prowl to calculate the size of the German troops and later to speak with Nazi officials, with the risk of not having enshrined Geneva Convention rights as ambassador.

Maddalena Cerasuolo participated in the battle against the German troops by defending the Ponte della Sanità with the partisans of the neighborhoods Materdei and Stella, led by her father Carlo Cerasuolo, lieutenant Dino Del Prete and firefighter officer Vinicio Giacomelli. They contributed to keeping open an important entranceway to the city, and also an important branch of the aqueduct that supplied the center of Naples.

For this episode she received a Medal of Military Valor and she was invited to the Royal Palace by General Montgomery, who hugged and kissed her.

Collaboration with UK secret services 

Maddalena Cerasuolo, with her alias "Maria Esposito", agent number "C22", from 23 October 1943 to 8 February 1944, operated with the Special Operations Executive (SOE), which is the British secret service. After a short training at Castello Mezzatorre in Forio di Ischia, she participated in the missions named "Hillside II" and "Kelvin".

The Hillside II mission consisted of passing beyond enemy lines, but it ended with three failed attempts.

Kelvin was a maritime mission. Cerasuolo used a motor torpedo boat directed to Corsica, to get to the coast of Liguria from Bastia, to sabotage military sites by using weapons and explosives, as planned by the British strategy. Also this mission ended with a failure, five attempts without any landing. Moreover, Maddalena lost all her clothes that she had with herself, and was later reimbursed by the SOE.

Still working with the SOE, Maddalena parachuted beyond the enemy lines when in Italy they were marked from Rome to Montecassino, to collect information by pretending to be the maid of the artist Anna d'Andria, who was collaborating by giving high society parties to understand the strategy of the German army.

In the personal file of the SOE Maddalena is recorded as housewife, not married, living in vico della Neve, 23, Materdei, Naples at Carlo Cerasuolo's house, active as special agent from 21 October 1943 to 8 February 1944 – even though she was still available to continue – with the following service notes:

Recognition 
Cerasuolo received several recognitions, both during her life, such as the Medal of Military Valor and other prestigious acknowledgements, and after her death, among those a toponymical dedication in the city of Naples.

Military recognitions 

On 24 May 1946 she was honored with the Bronze Medal of Military Valor with the following citation:
 The collaboration with the SOE was recognized, besides with economic reimbursement, also with the following acknowledgement:

Civilian recognitions 

Once the war ended, she received a certificate of merit signed by officer H.S. Carruthers, by the British kingdom.

The year after her death, on 3 March 2000, the mayor Rosa Russo Iervolino inaugurated a commemorative plaque for Maddalena Cerasuolo, placed by Comune di Napoli and Istituto Campano per la Storia della Resistenza.

Popular culture 
Maddalena Cerasuolo's memory is held in the culture of the city of Naples, since she is quoted in several texts about the Resistenza and the Four days of Naples. Sometimes her story is brought up also in support of the thesis that Neapolitan resistance was not led by spontaneous riots, as is largely believed, but as the result of activity organized locally, within an internationally agreed strategy.

Books 
In 2014, her daughter Gaetana Morgese published a book dedicated to her biography.

She is quoted in several Italian books, such as the romance Il paradiso dei diavoli by Franco di Mare, 2013, in Le donne erediteranno la terra and in Possa il mio sangue servire by Aldo Cazzullo, 2016 and finally in Il treno dei bambini by Viola Ardone.

Music 
In 1995, Carlo Faiello wrote lyrics and music of a song dedicated to Maddalena Cerasuolo, entitled "Maddalena", which was interpreted by several artists such as:

 Nuova Compagnia di Canto Popolare (1995)
 Lina Sastri (2000)
 Anna Maria Castelli (2010)
 Neapolis in fabula (2011)
 Paola Subrizi Quartet (2018)

See also 
 Four days of Naples
 Italian resistance movement
 Special Operations Executive (SOE)
 History of women in the Italian Resistance

References

Bibliography

External links 

 ANPI, Biography about Maddalena Cerasuolo, on anpi.it
 
 Testimoni della Storia, Maddalena Cerasuolo, on raiscuola.rai.it, RAI

Recipients of the Bronze Medal of Military Valor
Italian anti-fascists
Italian resistance movement members
1920 births
1999 deaths
Female anti-fascists